Accumoli is a  (municipality) in the Province of Rieti in the Italian region of Lazio, located about  northeast of Rome and about  northeast of Rieti. It is located in the natural park known as the "Gran Sasso e Monti della Laga National Park".
 
Located at an altitude of 855 m above sea level in the Umbria-Marche Apennines, Accumoli is an enclave within the province of Ascoli Piceno. Until 1927, it was part of the province of Aquila in Abruzzo.

The climate is typical internal Apennines with cold, snowy winters and summers almost never too hot.

History 
The town has its origins in the 12th century, when the territory in the Valle del Tronto was ruled by the Normans and later the Kingdom of Naples.

On 24 August 2016, numerous buildings were destroyed and damaged by the Central Italy earthquake.

Main sights 
Civic Tower (12th century)
Palazzo del Podestà, now the town hall 
Palazzo del Guasto (15th century). 
Palazzo Marini, in Mannerist style. is characterized by a portal framed by ashlar diamond and columns with Ionic capitals in twisted elephant legs.
Palazzo Cappello (17th century), located near the medieval fortress
 Monument to Salvatore (1927)

References

Cities and towns in Lazio